Mallonia australis is a species of beetle in the family Cerambycidae. It was described by Péringuey in 1888. It is known from Zambia, Mozambique, and South Africa.

References

Pachystolini
Beetles described in 1888
Taxa named by Louis Péringuey